The Kentucky League of Cities (founded 1927 as the Kentucky Municipal League) is a voluntary league of cities in Kentucky. Its mission is to serve "as the united voice of cities by supporting community innovation, effective leadership and quality governance." It is a member of the National League of Cities and operates from Lexington, Kentucky. The president of the organization is usually succeeded by its vice president.

Presidents
 1929–1931: Dr. C. T. Coleman, Mayor of Frankfort
 1933–1934: Paul Morton, City Manager of Lexington
 1934–1935: Edgar Hager, Mayor of Ashland
 1935–1936: Edward G. Scott, Mayor of Paducah
 2017–2018: Jim Barnes, Mayor or Richmond

References

External links
 Official website

1927 establishments in Kentucky
Civic and political organizations of the United States
Lexington, Kentucky
Councils of governments